Egon Schmitt (born 12 November 1948) is a German former footballer who played as a defender. He competed for West Germany in the men's tournament at the 1972 Summer Olympics.

References

External links
 

1948 births
Living people
German footballers
Association football defenders
Olympic footballers of West Germany
West German footballers
Footballers at the 1972 Summer Olympics
People from Mühlheim am Main
Sportspeople from Darmstadt (region)
Kickers Offenbach players
1. FC Saarbrücken players
Footballers from Hesse